Henry Logan may refer to:

Henry Logan (politician) (1784–1866), member of the United States House of Representatives from Pennsylvania
Henry Logan (basketball) (born 1946), basketball player
Harry Logan (1888–?), Scottish footballer